The music of the Final Fantasy Tactics series, composed of Final Fantasy Tactics, Tactics Advance, Tactics A2: Grimoire of the Rift, and The War of the Lions, was primarily composed by Hitoshi Sakimoto. He was assisted by Masaharu Iwata in composing the music for Final Fantasy Tactics. The Final Fantasy Tactics Original Soundtrack, a compilation of almost all of the music in the game, was released by DigiCube in 1997, and re-released by Square Enix in 2006. No separate soundtrack has been released for Final Fantasy Tactics: The War of the Lions. The soundtrack was well received by critics, who found it to be astounding and one of the best video game music soundtracks in existence at the time of its release.

The music of Final Fantasy Tactics Advance was again composed by Hitoshi Sakimoto, with assistance from Nobuo Uematsu, Kaori Ohkoshi, and Ayako Saso. The Final Fantasy Tactics Advance Original Soundtrack, a compilation of almost all of the music in the game, was released by DigiCube in 2003. A new age arrangement album entitled White: Melodies of Final Fantasy Tactics Advance, a selection of musical tracks from the game arranged by Yo Yamazaki, Akira Sasaki, and Satoshi Henmi, was released by SME Visual Works in 2003. Final Fantasy Tactics Advance Original Soundtrack was well received by critics, who praised the album's composition. Critics did not react as well to the White: Melodies of Final Fantasy Tactics Advance album, finding it to be a mediocre album with poor arrangements.

The music for Final Fantasy Tactics A2: Grimoire of the Rift was also composed by Hitoshi Sakimoto, this time with the assistance of composers from his company Basiscape. The music was released as Final Fantasy Tactics A2: Grimoire of the Rift Original Soundtrack by Square Enix in 2007. It was enjoyed by reviewers, who found it to be pleasant and rewarding.

Albums

Final Fantasy Tactics Original Soundtrack

Final Fantasy Tactics Original Soundtrack is a soundtrack album of video game music from Final Fantasy Tactics, and was composed by Hitoshi Sakimoto and Masaharu Iwata. Sakimoto composed 46 tracks for the game, and Iwata composed the other 25. The album was first released on two Compact Discs by DigiCube on June 21, 1997, bearing the catalog number SSCX-10008, and was re-released by Square Enix on March 24, 2006, with the catalog numbers SQEX-10066-7. It spans two discs and 71 tracks, covering a duration of 2:31:03.

The Final Fantasy Tactics Original Soundtrack reached #62 on the Japan Oricon charts, selling over 12,400 copies. It received positive reviews from critics such as Patrick Gann of RPGFan. Ryan of Square Enix Music Online praised the way that the two composers' pieces blended together, and termed the album "one of the greatest soundtracks ever made and a true work of inspiration".

Track list

Final Fantasy Tactics Advance Original Soundtrack

Final Fantasy Tactics Advance Original Soundtrack is a soundtrack album of video game music from Final Fantasy Tactics Advance. The album contains the musical tracks from the game, composed mainly by Hitoshi Sakimoto, with assistance from Nobuo Uematsu, Kaori Ohkoshi, and Ayako Saso. It spans 74 tracks and covers a duration of 2:05:27. The first disk includes every piece of music from the game, as it sounds through the Game Boy Advance hardware. The second disk contains synthesized versions of 32 of the same 42 tracks. The album was released on February 19, 2003, by DigiCube. The release bears the catalog numbers SSCX-10083-4 or SQEX-10070-1 (reprint).

The album reached #130 on the Oricon charts, selling over 1,800 copies. It was received favorably by critics; Richard Vardaro of RPGFan found it to be "beautifully composed" and compared it favorably to the soundtrack to Final Fantasy Tactics. However, he questioned the inclusion of the Game Boy Advance version of the soundtrack, finding it to be "tinny and raspy". Chris of Square Enix Music Online also enjoyed the soundtrack, seeing it as "creative, appealing, and mature" and "a must-have".

Track list

White: Melodies of Final Fantasy Tactics Advance

White: Melodies of Final Fantasy Tactics Advance is an arranged album of music from Final Fantasy Tactics Advance. The album contains the musical tracks from the game, composed mainly by Hitoshi Sakimoto, with assistance from Nobuo Uematsu, Kaori Ohkoshi, and Ayako Saso, and arranged by Yo Yamazaki, Akira Sasaki, and Satoshi Henmi. It spans 11 tracks and covers a duration of 46:10. It was released on February 26, 2003, by SME Visual Works. The release bears the catalog number SVWC-7172.

White was not received well by critics, with Patrick Gann finding it to be a mediocre album and saying that he felt "very disappointed" with it. He found the "new-age" style to be poorly chosen and the arrangements to be sub-par. Zeugma of Square Enix Music Online was more approving of the album, saying that it conveyed the "quiet mood" it promised, but finding it to sometimes be "dangerously close to muzak" with too many synthesized instruments and too little variation.

Final Fantasy Tactics A2: Grimoire of the Rift Original Soundtrack

Final Fantasy Tactics A2: Grimoire of the Rift Original Soundtrack is a soundtrack album of music from Final Fantasy Tactics A2: Grimoire of the Rift. The album contains the musical tracks from the game, composed mainly by Hitoshi Sakimoto, with assistance of composers from Basiscape, his composing studio. Several compositions were also taken from the scores of Final Fantasy Tactics Advance and Final Fantasy XII. It spans 56 tracks across two disks and covers a duration of 2:13:10. It was released on November 28, 2007, by Square Enix. The release bears the catalog numbers SQEX-710102-3.

The album received positive reviews from critics, with Vincent Chorley of RPGFan terming it "one of the most rewardingly pleasant soundtracks this year". Ovelia of Square Enix Music Online also enjoyed the soundtrack, saying that it was "mature yet still playful", but worried that it hinted at a stagnation in Sakimoto's musical style.

Track list

Legacy
A radio drama based on Final Fantasy Tactics Advance was broadcast starting in January 2003, preceding the release of the game. The shows were compiled in a series of four CDs entitled Final Fantasy Tactics Advance Radio Edition vol. 1-4. The CDs were released by DigiCube on February 26, March 26, April 23, and May 21, 2003, with the catalog numbers SSCX-10082, SSCX-10088, SSCX-10092, and SSCX-10094, respectively. Additionally, a single was released by Sony Records on November 27, 2002, with the catalog number SRCL-5513 containing the song "Shiroi hana", performed by Zone, which was used as an image song for commercials for Final Fantasy Tactics Advance. A medley of pieces from Final Fantasy Tactics A2 was played at the Fantasy Comes Alive concert in Singapore on April 30, 2010. Selections of music from the Final Fantasy Tactics series have also appeared on Japanese remix albums, called dojin music, and on English remixing websites.

References

External links
 Square Enix's official music store

1997 soundtrack albums
2003 soundtrack albums
Tactics series
Final Fantasy Tactics
Hitoshi Sakimoto albums
Final Fantasy Tactics
2007 soundtrack albums